Football Federation of Rivne Oblast is a football governing body in the region of Rivne Oblast, Ukraine. The federation is a member of the Football Federation of Ukraine.

Members

 Demydiv Raion Football Federation
 Zarichne Raion Football Federation
 Kostopil Raion Football Federation
 Dubrovytsia Raion Football Federation
 Rivne Municipal Football Federation
 Berezne Raion Football Federation
 Dubno Municipal Football Federation
 Rokytne Raion Football Federation
 Hoshcha Raion Football Federation
 Sarny Raion Football Federation
 Dubno Raion Football Federation
 Football Federation of Varash
 Ostroh Municipal Football Federation
Associative
 Zdolbuniv Municipal Football Federation
 Futsal Association of Rivne Oblast

Previous Champions

1948    FC Lokomotyv Rivne (1)
1949    FC Dynamo Rivne (1)
1950    ???
1951    ???
1952    FC Dynamo Rivne (2)
1953    FC Dynamo Rivne (3)
1954    FC Dynamo Rivne (4)
1955    FC Kolhospnyk Hoshcha (1)
1956    FC Kolhospnyk Hoshcha (2)
1957    FC Kolhospnyk Hoshcha (3)
1958    FC Kolhospnyk Hoshcha (4)
1959    FC Avanhard Kostopil (1)
1960    FC Spartak Rivne (1)
1961    FC Spartak Rivne (2)
1962    FC Horyn Dubrovytsia (1)
1963    FC Tekstylnyk Rivne (1)
1964    FC Avanhard Rivne (1)
1965    FC Tekstylnyk Rivne (2)
1966    FC Tekstylnyk Rivne (3)
1967    RZTZ Rivne (1)
1968    FC Horyn Dubrovytsia (2)
1969    FC Torpedo Rivne (1)
1970    FC Torpedo Rivne (2)
1971    FC Torpedo Rivne (3)
1972    FC Torpedo Rivne (4)
1973    FC Torpedo Rivne (5)
1974    FC Torpedo Rivne (6)
1975    FC Torpedo Rivne (7)
1976    FC Torpedo Rivne (8)
1977    FC Torpedo Rivne (9)
1978    FC Vodnyk Rivne (1)
1979    FC Budivelnyk Kuznetsovsk (1)
1980    FC Metalist Sarny (1)
1981    FC Mayak Sarny (1)
1982    FC Sluch Berezne (1)
1983    FC Sokil Chervonoarmiysk (1)
1984    FC Sluch Berezne (2)
1985    FC Sokil Chervonoarmiysk (2)
1986    FC Sluch Berezne (3)
1987    FC Spartak Dubno (1)
1988    FC Sluch Berezne (4)
1989    FC Khimik Rivne (1)
1990    ???
1991    ???
1992    ???
1992-93 FC Izotop Kuznetsovsk (1)
1994    ???
1995    FC Sokil Radyvyliv (3)
1996    FC Sokil Radyvyliv (4)
1997    FC Sluch Berezne (5)
1998    FC Sluch Berezne (6)
1999    FC Sokil Radyvyliv (5)
2000    FC Metalist Zdolbuniv (1)
2001    FC Sokil Radyvyliv (6)
2002    FC ODEK Orzhiv (1)
2003    FC ODEK Orzhiv (2)
2004    FC ODEK Orzhiv (3)
2005    FC Mayak Sarny (2)
2006    FC ODEK Orzhiv (4)
2007    FC ODEK Orzhiv (5)
2008    FC ODEK Orzhiv (6)
2009    FC Slavia Rivne (1)
2010    FC Khimik Rivne (2)
2011    FC ODEK Orzhiv (7)
2012    FC Slavia Rivne (2)
2013    FC ODEK Orzhiv (8)
2014    FC ODEK Orzhiv (9)
2015    FC Mayak Sarny (3)
2016    FC ODEK Orzhiv (10)
2017    FC ODEK Orzhiv (11)
2018    FC Mayak Sarny (4)
2019    FC Malynsk

Top winners
11 – FC ODEK Orzhiv
 9 – FC Torpedo Rivne
 6 – FC Sluch Berezne
 6 – FC Sokil Radyvyliv
 4 – 3 clubs (Dynamo R., Kolhospnyk H., Mayak)
 3 – FC Tekstylnyk Rivne
 2 – 4 clubs (Spartak, Horyn, Khimik, Slavia)
 1 – 11 clubs

Professional clubs
 FC Dynamo Rivne, 1946
 NK Veres Rivne (Kolhospnyk, Horyn, Avangard), 1958–2011, 2015–
 FC Ikva Mlyniv, 2003–2004 (single season)

See also
 FFU Council of Regions

References

External links
 Official website. Rivne Oblast Football Federation

Football in the regions of Ukraine
Football governing bodies in Ukraine
Sport in Rivne Oblast